Valentin Ruslanovich Vinnichenko (born 21 April 1995) is a Russian football player.

Club career
He made his debut in the Russian Football National League for FC Torpedo Armavir on 20 March 2016 in a game against FC Gazovik Orenburg.

References

External links
 Profile by Russian Football National League

1995 births
People from Odintsovo
Living people
Russian people of Ukrainian descent
Russian footballers
Association football defenders
FC Armavir players
FC Spartak Moscow players
FC SKA Rostov-on-Don players
Sportspeople from Moscow Oblast